The men's singles tournament of the 2021 BWF World Championships took place from 12 to 19 December 2021 at the Palacio de los Deportes Carolina Marín at Huelva.

Seeds

The seeding list is based on the World Rankings of 23 November 2021.

 Kento Momota (withdrew)
 Viktor Axelsen (first round)
 Anders Antonsen (semi-finals)
 Chou Tien-chen (second round)
 Anthony Sinisuka Ginting (withdrew)
 Lee Zii Jia (quarter-finals)
 Jonatan Christie (withdrew)
 Ng Ka Long (first round)

<li> Kanta Tsuneyama (second round)
<li> Wang Tzu-wei (first round)
<li> Rasmus Gemke (third round)
<li> Srikanth Kidambi (final)
<li> Lee Cheuk Yiu (third round)
<li> B. Sai Praneeth (first round)
<li> Kenta Nishimoto (second round)
<li> Kantaphon Wangcharoen (third round)

Draw

Finals

Upper part

Groups 1

Section 2

Bottom half

Section 3

Section 4

References

2021 BWF World Championships